is a Japanese animation studio located in Musashino, Tokyo. It animated the first season of Hamatora, as well as adapting Nitro+chiral's visual novel Dramatical Murder into an anime series.

Works

Television series

ONAs

OVAs

Other projects

References

External links
  

 
Animation studios in Tokyo
Japanese animation studios
Japanese companies established in 2013
Mass media companies established in 2013
Musashino, Tokyo